Geddington railway station served the village of Geddington, Northamptonshire, England, from 1880 to 1948 on the Oakham-Kettering line.

History 
The station was opened on 1 March 1880 by the Midland Railway. It closed on 1 November 1948. The station building survives as a private residence.

References 

Disused railway stations in Northamptonshire
Former Midland Railway stations
Railway stations in Great Britain opened in 1880
Railway stations in Great Britain closed in 1948
1880 establishments in England
1948 disestablishments in England